The 2022 Louisiana Tech Bulldogs baseball team represented Louisiana Tech University in the sport of baseball for the 2022 college baseball season. The Bulldogs competed in Division I of the National Collegiate Athletic Association (NCAA) and in Conference USA West Division. They played their home games at J. C. Love Field at Pat Patterson Park, on the university's Ruston campus. The team was coached by Lane Burroughs, who was in his sixth season with the Bulldogs.

Preseason

C-USA media poll
The Conference USA preseason poll was released on February 16, 2022, with the Bulldogs predicted to finish in second place in the conference.

Preseason CUSA Pitcher of the Year
Jonathan Fincher – Redshirt Junior, Left-Handed Pitcher

Preseason All-CUSA team
Taylor Young – Infielder
Jonathan Fincher – Pitcher
Jarrett Whorf – Pitcher

Personnel

Schedule and results
{| class="toccolours" width=95% style="clear:both; margin:1.5em auto; text-align:center;"
|-
! colspan=2 style="" | 2022 Louisiana Tech Bulldogs Baseball Game Log
|-
! colspan=2 style="" | Regular Season (38–18)
|- valign="top"
|
{| class="wikitable collapsible" style="margin:auto; width:100%; text-align:center; font-size:95%"
! colspan=12 style="padding-left:4em;" | February (5–2)
|-
! Date
! Opponent
! Rank
! Site/Stadium
! Score
! Win
! Loss
! Save
! TV
! Attendance
! Overall Record
! C-USA Record
|- align="center" bgcolor="ddffdd"
|Feb. 18 ||  || || JC Love Field at Pat Patterson Park • Ruston, LA || W7–3 || Fincher(1-0) || McDonough(0-1) || Gibson(1) || CUSA.TV || 2,247 || 1–0 ||
|- align="center" bgcolor="ddffdd"
|Feb. 19 || Wichita State || || J. C. Love Field at Pat Patterson Park • Ruston, LA || W9–6 || Crigger(1-0) || Adler(0-1) || None || CUSA.TV || 2,307 || 2–0 ||
|- align="center" bgcolor="ddffdd"
|Feb. 20 || Wichita State || || J. C. Love Field at Pat Patterson Park • Ruston, LA || W5–3 || Martinez(1-0) || Stevens(0-1) || Crigger(1) || CUSA.TV || 2,261 || 3–0 ||
|- align="center" bgcolor="ddffdd"
|Feb. 23 || No. 8 LSU || || J. C. Love Field at Pat Patterson Park • Ruston, LA || W11–6 || Gibson(1-0) || Cooper(0-1) || None || ESPN+ || 2,529 || 4–0 ||
|- align="center" bgcolor="ddffdd"
|Feb. 25 ||  || || J. C. Love Field at Pat Patterson Park • Ruston, LA || W6–1 || Fincher(2-0) || Hoffman(0-1) || None || CUSA.TV || 2,256 || 5–0 ||
|- align="center" bgcolor="ffdddd"
|Feb. 27 || Tulane || || J. C. Love Field at Pat Patterson Park • Ruston, LA || L1–47 || Carmouche(2-0) || Jennings(0-1) || None || CUSA.TV || 2,110 || 5–1 ||
|- align="center" bgcolor="ffdddd"
|Feb. 27 || Tulane || || J. C. Love Field at Pat Patterson Park • Ruston, LA || L5–137 || Massey(1-0) || Whorff(0-1) || None || CUSA.TV || 2,304 || 5–2 ||
|}
|-
|

|-
|

|-
|

|-
! colspan=2 style="" | Postseason (5–3)
|-
|

|-
! colspan=9 | Legend:       = Win       = Loss       = Cancelled
|}Schedule Source:'''
*Rankings are based on the team's current ranking in the D1Baseball poll.

Austin Regional

Postseason

Rankings

References

External links
•	Louisiana Tech Baseball

Louisiana Tech
Louisiana Tech Bulldogs baseball seasons
Louisiana Tech Bulldogs baseball
Louisiana Tech